Specklinia alta is a species of orchid plant native to Ecuador.

References 

alta
Orchids of Central America
Orchids of Belize
Flora of Ecuador
Plants described in 2004